The 170s decade ran from January 1, 170, to December 31, 179.

Significant people
 Marcus Aurelius, Roman Emperor
 Caerellius Priscus, governor of Roman Britain

References